Lendfjellet is a mountain on the border of Skjåk Municipality and Lom Municipality in Innlandet county, Norway. The mountain is surrounded by several other notable mountains including Lomseggi to the east, Storhøi to the south, Moldulhøi and Sandgrovhøi to the southwest.

See also
List of mountains of Norway

References

Skjåk
Lom, Norway
Mountains of Innlandet